US Highway 25A in Michigan can refer to either of two separate highways:
U.S. Route 25A (Erie, Michigan), an alternate route near Erie in Monroe County
U.S. Route 25A (Port Huron, Michigan), an alternate route near Port Huron in St. Clair County

25A in Michigan
A in Michigan
25A in Michigan